Harvest Moon DS: Grand Bazaar, known in Japan as , is a simulation role-playing video game released on December 18, 2008 by Marvelous Interactive in Japan, and released on August 24, 2010 by Natsume in North America. It was released in Europe on September 30, 2011 by Rising Star Games. The game is the nineteenth game in the Story of Seasons series and the fifth game in the series for the Nintendo DS.

Reception

The game received "average" reviews according to the review aggregation website Metacritic. In Japan, Famitsu gave it a score of two sevens and two eights for a total of 30 out of 40.

References

External links
 

2008 video games
Story of Seasons games
Nintendo DS games
Nintendo DS-only games
Role-playing video games
Multiplayer online games
Nintendo Wi-Fi Connection games
Video games developed in Japan
Video games featuring protagonists of selectable gender
Rising Star Games games
Multiplayer and single-player video games